is a city in Yamagata Prefecture, Japan. , the city had an estimated population of 81,707 in 33,278 households, and a population density of 150 persons per km2. Yonezawa is most famous for its local delicacies (apples, Yonezawa beef, and carp) and for being a castle town that was once home to the Uesugi clan, including the daimyō Uesugi Yozan.

Geography
Yonezawa is located in the southeast corner of Yamagata Prefecture. The southern and eastern portions of the city are river basins surrounded by large  mountains, forming the Yonezawa Basin. The southern portion of the city has a complex terrain with several rivers and alternating ridges and valleys orientated east to west. The Mogami River flows through the city. Part of the city is within the borders of the Bandai-Asahi National Park.

Neighboring municipalities
Yamagata Prefecture
Takahata, Yamagata
Kawanishi, Yamagata
Iide, Yamagata
Fukushima Prefecture
Fukushima, Fukushima
Kitakata, Fukushima
Inawashiro, Fukushima
Kitashiobara, Fukushima

Climate
Yonezawa has a Humid continental climate (Köppen climate classification Cfa) with large seasonal temperature differences, with warm to hot (and often humid) summers and cold (sometimes severely cold) winters. Precipitation is significant throughout the year, but is heaviest from August to October.

Demographics
Per Japanese census data, the population of Yonezawa has recently declined after a long period of stability.

History
The area of present-day Yonezawa was part of ancient Dewa Province and was controlled in the Sengoku period by the Date clan. The famed warlord Date Masamune was born in Yonezawa. During the Edo period, the area became Yonezawa Domain under the Tokugawa shogunate, ruled by the Uesugi clan. After the start of the Meiji period, the area was organized into Minamiokitama District, Yamagata Prefecture.

The city of Yamagata was established on April 1, 1889, with the establishment of the modern municipalities system

Government
Yonezawa has a mayor-council form of government with a directly elected mayor and a unicameral city legislature of 24 members. The city contributes three members to the Yamagata Prefectural Assembly.  In terms of national politics, the city is part of Yamagata District 3 of the lower house of the Diet of Japan.

List of mayor of Yonezawa

Economy
The economy of Yamagata is based on agriculture, horticulture, light manufacturing and tourism.

Education

Colleges and universities
Yamagata University Yonezawa campus
Yonezawa Women's Junior College

Primary and secondary education
Yonezawa has 18 public elementary schools and eight public middle schools operated by the city government and four public high schools operated by the Yamagata Prefectural Board of Education. There are also two private high schools.

Transportation

Railway
 East Japan Railway Company - Yamagata Shinkansen
 
 East Japan Railway Company -  Ōu Main Line
  -  -  -  -  - 
 East Japan Railway Company -  Yonesaka Line
 -  -  -

Highways
  – Yonezawa IC

Local attractions
Yonezawa City Uesugi Museum
Yonezawa Castle
Tateyama Castle
Yonezawa Onsen
Namegawa Great Falls
Shirabu Onsen (in gorges of Otaru River south of Yonezawa)

International relations

Twin towns — Sister cities
Moses Lake, WA

Japan
 Takanabe, Miyazaki, since 1981
 Jōetsu, Niigata, since 1981
 Okinawa, Okinawa, since 1994
 Tōkai, Aichi, since 1999

Worldwide
  Taubaté, Brazil, since January 28, 1974
  Moses Lake, Washington, USA, since May 1, 1981

Notable people from Yonezawa 

Junzaburo Ban, actor
Itō Chūta, architect
Takehiko Endo, politician
Yamashita Gentarō, admiral, Imperial Japanese Navy
Masami Kobayashi, admiral, Imperial Japanese Navy
Hiroshi Masumura, manga artist
Mutsuo Minagawa, Nippon Professional Baseball player
Chūichi Nagumo, admiral, Imperial Japanese Navy
Ikeda Shigeaki, politician
Hirata Tosuke, Meiji period statesman

References

External links 

Official Website 
Yonezawa Sightseeing Website

 
Cities in Yamagata Prefecture